Anna Senior  (born 1941) is an Australian costume designer who has been nominated for an Academy Award and has won two awards from the Australian Film Institute.

She was nominated at the 53rd Academy Awards in the category of Best Costumes for her work on the film My Brilliant Career.

Senior was awarded the Medal of the Order of Australia (OAM) in the 2022 Queen's Birthday Honours.

Selected filmography

 The Getting of Wisdom (1978)
 My Brilliant Career (1979)
 Breaker Morant (1980)
 Maybe This Time (1980)
 Phar Lap (1983)
 The Fire in the Stone (1984)

References

External links

Australian costume designers
Living people
Place of birth missing (living people)
1941 births

Recipients of the Medal of the Order of Australia